Bile-acid 7alpha-dehydroxylase (cholate 7alpha-dehydroxylase, 7alpha-dehydroxylase, bile acid 7-dehydroxylase) was thought to be an enzyme with systematic name deoxycholate:NAD+ oxidoreductase.

However, it was later shown that the dehydroxylation is carried out by seven different enzymes, catalyzing a total of 8 reactions.

References

External links 
 

EC 1.17.99